Shchuchy is a rural locality (a khutor) in Kletskoye Rural Settlement, Sredneakhtubinsky District, Volgograd Oblast, Russia. The population was 239 as of 2010. There are 13 streets.

Geography 
Shchuchy is located 33 km southwest of Srednyaya Akhtuba (the district's administrative centre) by road. Plamenka is the nearest rural locality.

References 

Rural localities in Sredneakhtubinsky District